
McAdam or MacAdam is a Scottish Gaelic clan which originated as a branch of Clan Gregor. As a surname it is most prominent in the Galloway and Ayrshire regions of Scotland. Some of their descendants are also to be found in Ireland, the United States, Australia and Canada.

Notable people with the surname include:

Sports
 Adrian McAdam (born 1971), Australian Rules footballer
 Al McAdam (born 1952), Canadian Ice Hockey player and coach
 Colin McAdam (born 1951), a Scottish footballer most notable for playing for Rangers
 Gilbert McAdam (born 1967), Australian Rules footballer
 Greg McAdam (born 1961), Australian Rules footballer
 Keith McAdam (born 1945), Scottish cricketer and specialist in tropical diseases
 Tom McAdam, (born 1954) Scottish footballer most notable for playing for Celtic

Academics and technology
 David MacAdam (1910–1998), American color scientist
 Doug McAdam (born 1951), American sociologist studying social movements
 John Loudon McAdam (1756–1836), Scottish engineer noted for inventing the process of "macadamization" of roads
 John Macadam (1827–1865), Australian (Scottish-born) chemist, medical teacher and politician, after whom the Macadamia nut is named

Art, architecture and literature
 Colin McAdam (born 1971), Canadian novelist
 Margaret Macadam (1902–1991), British illustrator active during the 1920s and 1930s
 Patrick "Pat" MacAdam (1934-2015), Canadian writer
 Sean McAdam, American baseball writer
 T. A. McAdam (fl. 1940s), professional partner of Herbert Jory in  Jory and McAdam, architectural practice in Adelaide, South Australia
 Trish McAdam (born 1955), Irish screen director

Politics and government
 Elliot McAdam (born 1951), Australian politician and Northern Territory Cabinet member
 John McAdam (1807-1893), Irish-born politician in New Brunswick, Canada

Business
 John McAdam, (born 1948), American-English businessman
 John McAdam, (born 1906), American businessman

External links

Surnames of Scottish origin
Surnames from given names